San Diego Cable Sports Network was a pay-per-view service offered by Cox Communications. It was established in 1984 to provide telecasts of San Diego Padres games, initially offering 40 games a season. Games could be purchased separately or as a package. In addition to Cox, Sun Cable and American Cable Television also provided the service. The 1993 season would be the Padres last on the San Diego Cable Sports Network, as they would sign a deal with Prime Ticket to appear on a new subfeed of that network in 1994.

References

Defunct local cable stations in the United States
Television channels and stations established in 1984
Television channels and stations disestablished in 1993
Cox Communications